Baghdad Perazhagi is a 1973 Indian Tamil-language historical drama film directed by T. R. Ramanna. It starred Jayalalitha in the lead role opposite Ravichandran while Jayasudha, Savitri and Shubha play supporting roles. It was released on 25 October 1973 and emerged as a commercial success. Its Hindi dubbed version, Shehzadi Mumtaz was released four years later (in 1977).

Plot

Cast 
Jayalalithaa as Mumtaj
Ravichandran as Prince Abdullah
Savitri as Queen Khadija
Major Sundarrajan as Sultan Syed Ali Hasan
Nagesh  as Kamar
S. A. Ashokan as Raja Guru Sardar
A. Sakunthala as Zubeida
R. S. Manohar as Thalapathi Muras
V. K. Ramasamy as Mama
Thengai Srinivasan as Gulabi
Sachu as Suraiyya
Shubha as Princess Zeenat
Jayasudha as Shakila
Pushpamala
Ennatha Kannaiya as Raja Guru Assistant
Typist Gopu as Raja Guru Assistant
Sarala
Shanmugasundaram as Thalapathi Sikander

Soundtrack 
The music composed by M. S. Viswanathan, with lyrics by Pulamaipithan.

References

External links 
 

1970s Tamil-language films
1973 films
Films directed by T. R. Ramanna
Films scored by M. S. Viswanathan
Films set in Baghdad
Indian historical drama films
1970s historical drama films